Mamadou Hamidou Niang (born 13 October 1979) is a Senegalese former professional footballer who played as a striker. He has represented Senegal at international level, participating in the 2004, 2006, and 2008 African Cup of Nations. He is the older brother of Papa Niang, who is also a professional footballer.

Career

Troyes
After beginning his career with the Le Havre youth team, Niang turned professional at 18 years of age with Troyes. He had a mixed beginning to his career with his first season featuring ten Ligue 1 starts, all from the bench, the following season would show little improvement with 17 starts and only 3 league goals.

Loan to Metz
A loan period with Ligue 2 club FC Metz allowed him to hone his skills, contributing 5 goals in 12 appearances and helping Metz return to top flight French football for the 2003–04 season.

Strasbourg
Jean Fernandez, the Metz manager, tried to make the loan deal into a permanent move but failed and Niang left Troyes for Strasbourg. The arrival of Danijel Ljuboja, to Strasbourg at the same time allowed Niang to form an important strike partnership until Ljuboja moved to Paris Saint-Germain. Niang didn't score again for the remainder of the second half of that season.

The 2004–05 season saw Mickaël Pagis arrive at Strasbourg, and a fruitful new partnership was formed, with the pair linking up for 27 goals in the league. This partnership helped Strasbourg make it to the Coupe de la Ligue final, where victory over Caen gave Strasbourg their second Coupe de la Ligue trophy. Niang scored Strasbourg's first goal as they won 2–1.

Marseille

In 2005, Niang moved to Marseille for a reported fee of €7 million. He was joined six months later by Mickaël Pagis. Niang finished the season as Marseille's top scorer with ten goals but Marseille lost the Coupe de France final to Paris Saint-Germain.

Niang was selected Marseille player of the month by the fans for May 2008.

Niang would go on to finish the 2009–10 season with 18 goals in Ligue 1, making him the highest scorer in the league and Marseille's highest scorer with 28 goals in all competitions.

Fenerbahçe
Niang signed a 3+1 year deal with Fenerbahçe on 14 August 2010 for a fee of reported €8 million.
He made a great start with Fenerbahçe SK when he scored 7 goals in his first 6 league appearances. Niang scored his first hat-trick for Fenerbahçe on his 5th appearance when they won 6–2 against Kasımpaşa. He helped his side win the 2010–11 Süper Lig, scoring 16 goals in 29 appearances.

Al Sadd
On 6 September 2011, Niang was sold to Al-Sadd for €7.5 million.

On 19 October 2011, at the 2011 AFC Champions League semi-final match against Suwon Samsung Bluewings, he scored the controversial, un-sportsmanlike second goal for his team. Al Sadd should've sent the ball back to the Bluewings since the play was suspended when the home team's player was injured. However, while Suwon's defense stood still thinking their goalkeeper will get the ball back, Niang stole the ball and went past the goalkeeper to score. The goal induced an intrusion of a home fan and a huge melee of both players and bench. The controversy got bigger when Al Sadd's player Keita took a swing at a home fan. Even though his goal was against general notion of fair-play, Niang argued that there was no problem with his goal, and that it was Suwon who played without manners, inducing melee between two teams.  After all, AFC did not conclude this issue justly, by giving disciplinary actions to Suwon only, Al Sadd getting absolutely nothing, not even Niang or Keita. He then got himself sent-off in injury time for kicking the ball away when he was flagged offside, receiving another yellow card in addition to his previous, meaning he could not participate in the second leg in Doha.

Beşiktaş (loan)
On 31 January 2013, Niang moved to Turkish side Beşiktaş on loan until the end of the season.

On 3 March 2013, he scored his first goal and contributed with an assist in a 3–2 win against his old club Fenerbahçe securing 3 points for his team in the final derby ever on İnönü Stadium.

Arles-Avignon
On 28 August 2014, Niang returned to France to sign for AC Arles-Avignon, having been overseas for the last four years.

International career
Niang represented the national team at the 2006 Africa Cup of Nations, where his team took fourth place for the third time in history.

Career statistics

Club

International
Scores and results list Senegal's goal tally first, score column indicates score after each Niang goal.

Honours
Troyes
 UEFA Intertoto Cup: 2001

Strasbourg
 Coupe de la Ligue: 2004–05

Marseille
 Ligue 1: 2009–10
 Coupe de la Ligue: 2009–10
 Trophée des Champions: 2010
 UEFA Intertoto Cup: 2005

Fenerbahçe
 Süper Lig: 2010–11

Al Sadd
 AFC Champions League: 2011

Senegal
 Africa Cup of Nations fourth place: 2006

Individual
 UNFP Ligue 1 Player of the Month: May 2005, December 2005, December 2007
 UNFP Ligue 1 Team of the Year: 2007–08, 2009–10
 UNFP Ligue 1 Goal of the Year: 2009–10
 Ligue 1 top scorer: 2009–10
 Marseille Player of the Season: 2009–10

References

External links
 
 
 Mamadou Niang Fenerbahçe Profile 
 

1979 births
Living people
Senegalese footballers
Senegal international footballers
French sportspeople of Senegalese descent
2004 African Cup of Nations players
2006 Africa Cup of Nations players
2008 Africa Cup of Nations players
Olympique de Marseille players
RC Strasbourg Alsace players
FC Metz players
ES Troyes AC players
Fenerbahçe S.K. footballers
Beşiktaş J.K. footballers
AC Arlésien players
Ligue 1 players
Ligue 2 players
Championnat National 2 players
Süper Lig players
Senegalese expatriate footballers
Expatriate footballers in France
Expatriate footballers in Turkey
Association football forwards
Qatar Stars League players
2012 Africa Cup of Nations players
Senegalese expatriate sportspeople in Turkey
Expatriate footballers in Qatar
Senegalese expatriate sportspeople in Qatar